Federal Highway 53 (Carretera Federal 53) (Fed. 53) is part of the free (libre) part of the federal highways corridors (los corredores carreteros federales) of Mexico, and connects metropolitan Monterrey, Nuevo León to Boquillas del Carmen, Coahuila near the Mexico–United States border.

|-
|N.L.
|115.90
|72.02
|-
|Coah.
|405.71
|252.10
|-
|Total
|521.61
|324.11
|}

Major intersections

Southern terminus at  near Apodaca, N.L.
 in General Escobedo
 near Castaños, Coah.
 in Monclova
 in Nueva Rosita

The northern terminus is at Boquillas del Carmen near the Mexico–United States border along the Rio Grande.

References

053